Glee is an American musical comedy-drama television series produced by Fox. It focuses on the glee club New Directions, at the fictional William McKinley High School in Lima, Ohio. The show was created by Ryan Murphy, Brad Falchuk and Ian Brennan, and features many cover versions of songs sung on-screen by the characters. Murphy is responsible for selecting all of the songs used, and strives to maintain a balance between show tunes and chart hits, as he wants there to be "something for everybody in every episode." Once Murphy selects a song, rights are cleared with its publishers by music supervisor P.J. Bloom, and music producer Adam Anders rearranges it for the Glee cast. Numbers are pre-recorded by the cast, while choreographer Zach Woodlee constructs the accompanying dance moves, which are then taught to the cast and filmed. Studio recordings of tracks are then made. The process begins six to eight weeks before each episode is filmed, and can end as late as the day before filming begins. For the first thirteen episodes of Glee first season, the show averaged five songs per episode, which increased to eight songs for the final nine episodes. In season two, Glee averaged six songs per episode. Murphy said in June 2011 that in season three, "I think we’ll probably end up trying to do four" songs per episode, but in actuality only one episode in the season was at or below that number, with the rest ranging from five to nine songs. The list below contains all 146 musical performances of the third season, with each performance delivering an individual song or a mashup of two or more songs in a single performance.

Songs

See also
 List of songs in Glee (season 1)
 List of songs in Glee (season 2)
 List of songs in Glee (season 4)
 List of songs in Glee (season 5)
 List of songs in Glee (season 6)
 Glee albums discography

Notes

References

General

Specific

Glee